Co-operative Commonwealth may refer to:

 Co-operative Commonwealth (society), a society based on cooperative and socialist principles
 Co-operative Commonwealth Federation, a defunct political party
 The Co-operative Commonwealth in its Outlines, An Exposition of Modern Socialism, an 1884 treatise by Laurence Gronlund

See also 

 
 
 Commonwealth (disambiguation)
 Cooperative (disambiguation)